Gayon is a commune in the Pyrénées-Atlantiques department in south-western France.

Infrastructures 
Gayon has a village hall next to the city hall.

There is also a church with a cemetery.

See also
Communes of the Pyrénées-Atlantiques department

References

Communes of Pyrénées-Atlantiques